Amanda Kathleen Haught (born November 3, 1998) is a professional soccer goalkeeper for Piteå IF. She has previously played professional soccer for NJ/NY Gotham FC.

Career
Growing up in the American South, Haught attended Sandalwood High School in Jacksonville, Florida and received a scholarship to play soccer at Virginia Tech. She started as a goalkeeper during her four seasons of soccer at Virginia Tech, where she was a back-to-back All-ACC first-team goalkeeper, before entering the NWSL Draft. She was the 20th overall pick in the 2020 NWSL Draft and signed with Sky Blue FC in 2020.

Haught has also represented the United States in international youth soccer competitions; she has been a member of the United States U-18 women's national soccer team and the United States women's national under-20 soccer team.

Personal life
In January 2021, Haught announced her engagement to Tommy Haught. Huaght proposed to McGlynn in Jacksonville Beach, Florida; the two had been dating since October 2019. The two married on December 1, 2022.

References

External links
 

1998 births
Living people
American women's soccer players
National Women's Soccer League players
NJ/NY Gotham FC draft picks
NJ/NY Gotham FC players
United States women's under-20 international soccer players
Virginia Tech Hokies women's soccer players
Women's association football goalkeepers